Agapy is a Russian Christian male first name. Its feminine version is Agapiya. The name is derived from the Greek word meaning loved one (cf. agape feast). Its colloquial forms are Agafy, Agafey, Ogafey, and Ogafy.

The diminutives of "Agapy" are Agap (which can also be a main form of a related name), Ogap, and Gapey.

"Agapy" is also an old form of the first name Agap. The patronymics derived from this form are "" (Agapiyevich), "" (Agapyevich; both masculine); and "" (Agapiyevna), "" (Agapyevna; both feminine).

References

Notes

Sources
А. В. Суперанская (A. V. Superanskaya). "Словарь русских имён" (Dictionary of Russian Names). Издательство Эксмо. Москва, 2005. 
Н. А. Петровский (N. A. Petrovsky). "Словарь русских личных имён" (Dictionary of Russian First Names). ООО Издательство "АСТ". Москва, 2005. 

